Timothy Bloom is a two time Grammy Award winning American alternative soul singer-songwriter and record producer.

Career
He began his career as a songwriter and producer, writing and producing Grammy Award-winning songs for both Ne-Yo ("Say it" on Because of you) and Chris Brown ("All Back" on FAME) as well as writing for Smokey Robinson ("My World", "Fallin in Love"). 
He was signed to Interscope via a joint deal with Polow Da Don and Timbaland. In 2010, Timothy released an EP on Interscope Records entitled "The Budding Rose" which contained the video for the single "Til the End of Time." The videos for both "'Til the End on Time" and "Possibilities" have over 4 million views on YouTube.

He deciding to part ways with the major label system just a few years back to venture out independently. In 2014, Timothy released an independent self-titled album, with the debut single "Stand in the Way (of MY LOVE)," which was No. 13 on the iTunes R&B charts release week and in the Billboard top 100 R&B albums. His CD "Timothy Bloom" was released October 13, 2014. The video for the single "Stand in the Way" features an appearance by legend Herbie Hancock. He was also named VH-1 Soul You Oughta Know artist in October. 
“If a woman's upset, you need to get this album and play it from top to bottom," said Bloom. "Get some candles, a little incense, get some bubble bath, some hot baby oil, and just play it out. Thank me later."

In 2016, Timothy Released his EP "The Beginning" and the track Adam and Eve was featured in the Fox Television show APB.

In 2017, Timothy scored the film "Honor Up" which is executive produced by Kanye West.

Personal life
Raised by two preachers, Timothy was born in Texas but reared in Fayetteville, North Carolina. As a young boy, Timothy was only allowed to listen to gospel music. He grew up on artists like the Staples singers but one day he ran away to the car, turned on the radio and the first song he heard was "Lay Lady Lay" by Bob Dylan and this influenced his decision to become a secular musician. He has a wide range of influences, including Bob Dylan, Prince, Jeff Buckley, Marvin Gaye and Jimi Hendrix. The North Carolina raised singer, songwriter and producer who plays piano, guitar, bass and drum now makes Los Angeles his home.

Awards

 2008 Grammy Award-Producer-Ne-Yo ("Say it" on Because of You)
 2010 Grammy Award-Producer/Songwriter Chris Brown ("All Back" on FAME)
 2015 Pepsi/Deezer Midem Accelerator Artist

Discography

References

External links 
 

American singer-songwriters
American male singer-songwriters
Year of birth missing (living people)
Living people